Sarabadiyeh, also rendered as Sarab Badiyeh or Sar Abadeyeh or Sarab-e Badieh or Sarab-e Badiyeh, may refer to:
 Sarabadiyeh-ye Olya
 Sarabadiyeh-ye Sofla